The Ultimate Collection (1948–1990) is a 1991 compilation album by John Lee Hooker. In 2003, the album was rated 375 on the Rolling Stone's "500 Greatest Albums of All Time", and 377 in a 2012 revised list.

Track listing

References

John Lee Hooker albums
1991 greatest hits albums
Rhino Records compilation albums